250 (from the album Polak) is a song of the Polish-French rapper PLK.

Music video
The song was recorded in 2018 and released on September 10, 2018 on YouTube.

Charts

References 

French songs
2018 songs
2018 singles